Shannon Michael Snell (born April 27, 1982) is an American former college and professional football player who was a guard for two seasons in the National Football League (NFL).  Snell played college football for the University of Florida, and earned All-American honors.  Thereafter, he played professionally for the Dallas Cowboys and the Jacksonville Jaguars of the NFL.

Early years 

Snell was born in Tampa, Florida in 1982.  He attended Hillsborough High School in Tampa, and was a three-year starter for the Hillsborough Terriers high school football team.  Following his senior season in 1999, he was recognized as a USA Today High School All-American.

College career 

Snell accepted an athletic scholarship to attend the University of Florida in Gainesville, Florida, where he was an offensive lineman for coach Steve Spurrier and coach Ron Zook's Florida Gators football teams from 2000 to 2003.  He was a three-season starter, who played in forty-six games and started thirty-six.  Snell was a Sporting News first-team All-American in 2003.

Professional career 

Snell was signed as an undrafted free agent by the Dallas Cowboys in 2005, and was signed by the Jacksonville Jaguars in 2006.

See also 

 2003 College Football All-America Team
 List of Florida Gators football All-Americans

References 

1982 births
Living people
All-American college football players
American football offensive guards
Dallas Cowboys players
Jacksonville Jaguars players
Florida Gators football players
Players of American football from Tampa, Florida